Flanimals: The Day of the Bletchling is the fourth book in the Flanimals series from British comedian Ricky Gervais and illustrator Rob Steen.

The book was published on 4 October 2007 and focuses on the Flanimals teaming up against an enormous swarm of Bletchling, a species that seeks to wipe out all other Flanimal life. The hardcover version of the book comes with a poster featuring a Clunge Ambler and a Molf, in a parody of the movie Jaws.

List of Flanimals 
 Bletchling – a 'super-Blug', an insectoid with a brain evil on a molecular level.
 Zub – a fatter, fuzzy Vap.
 Vap – similar to a wasp.
 Hord Shuffler – a blind blug that scuttles around.
 Monk Worm – larval stage of Frag Drier.
 Frag Drier – a hyperactive Flanimal similar to a dragonfly.
 Mov – a moth-like creature that will cling onto your arm.
 Bant – social, ant-like Blugs who are constantly busy.
 Klunt – a Flanimal with sharp teeth.
 Pseudo Klunt – mimics the Klunt, but has no teeth.
 Hapless Prey – draws attention to itself by sweating.
 Bleak – a gigantic Flanimal with no digestive fluids.
 Loan Figger – a bipedal frog-like creature.
 Goof Mump – appears in one scene but not described. It is green and goofy-looking in appearance and has stubby plane-like wings.
 Strankulator – a purple, Crocodile-like Flanimal that lives in rivers. It tends to eat any Flanimal that comes too close.

See also

Flanimals
More Flanimals
Flanimals of the Deep

External links 
 Official Website
 Flanimals on Ricky Gervais's site
 Flanimals on Rob Steen's site

2007 children's books
British children's books
British picture books
Children's fiction books
Faber and Faber books